John E. Barker (born April 16, 1951) is an American politician. He is a Republican member of the Kansas House of Representatives representing the 70th House District, and serves as the chairman of the House Committee on Federal and State Affairs.  He was initially elected to the Kansas House of Representatives in 2013.

Barker served as a judge for the Kansas Eighth Judicial District for 25 years.

References

1951 births
Living people
Republican Party members of the Kansas House of Representatives
21st-century American politicians
People from Abilene, Kansas